The Canadian Journal of Political Science is a peer-reviewed academic journal published by Cambridge University Press on behalf of the Canadian Political Science Association. In 1968, it was split off from a previous journal called The Canadian Journal of Economics and Political Science. The journal is published quarterly in both English and French.

The journal publishes original research, commentaries, review articles, and book reviews in all areas of political science, with an emphasis on Canadian politics and government as well as work by Canadian researchers. Subjects include the history of political thought, contemporary political theory, international relations, foreign policy, governmental institutions and processes, political behaviour, public administration and public policy, and women and politics.

References

External links 
 

Political science journals
Publications established in 1968
Multilingual journals
Cambridge University Press academic journals
Quarterly journals
Academic journals associated with learned and professional societies of Canada
Political science in Canada
1968 establishments in Canada